At the outbreak of the American Civil War  Oregon also raised the 1st Oregon Cavalry that was activated in 1862 and served until June 1865.  During the Civil War, emigrants to the newfound gold fields in Idaho and Oregon continued to clash with the Paiute, Shoshone and Bannock tribes of Oregon, Idaho and Nevada until relations degenerated into the bloody 1864 - 1868 Snake War.  The 1st Oregon Volunteer Infantry Regiment was formed in 1864 and its last company was mustered out of service in July 1867.  Both units were used to guard travel routes and Indian reservations, escort emigrant wagon trains, and protect settlers from Indian raiders. Several infantry detachments also accompanied survey parties and built roads in central and southern Oregon.

Oregon's second United States Senator,  Col. Edward Dickinson Baker was killed while leading Union troops at the Battle of Ball's Bluff near Leesburg, Virginia on October 21, 1861. His death in battle occurred exactly one month after another Oregonian, Captain James W. Lingenfelter of Company B, 71st Pennsylvania Infantry Regiment, was killed while on the picket line. In civilian life, Captain Lingenfelter had been a practicing attorney in Jacksonville, Oregon. He had been visiting in the East when the war started and enlisted to serve with Colonel Baker.

Oregon regiments in the Civil War

 1st Oregon Cavalry
 1st Oregon Volunteer Infantry Regiment
 Mountain Rangers (Oregon Militia)
 Washington Guards (Oregon Militia)
 Fenian Guards (Oregon Militia)
 Zouave Cadets (Oregon Militia)
 Marion Rifles (Oregon Militia)

Civil War posts, Oregon 

 Fort Dalles, Oregon, (1850–1867)
 Fort Yamhill, Oregon (1856–1866)
 Fort Hoskins, Oregon, (1857–1865)
 Siletz Blockhouse, Oregon (1858-1866)   
 Camp Baker, Oregon (1862-1865),
 Camp Barlow, Oregon, (1862) 
 Camp Clackamas, Oregon, (1862) 
 Post at Grand Ronde Indian Agency or Fort Lafayette, Oregon 1863,
 Fort Klamath, Oregon, (1863–1890)
 Fort at Point Adams, Oregon  (1863-1865)
 Fort Stevens, Oregon  (1865-1947)  
 Camp Alvord, Oregon (1864-1866) 
 Camp Dalgren, Oregon (1864)  
 Camp Henderson, Oregon, 1864-1866 
 Camp Lincoln, Oregon 1864
 Camp Maury, Oregon 1864
 Camp Russell, Oregon 1864-1865  
 Camp Watson, Oregon 1864-1869 
 Camp Colfax, Oregon, 1865, 1867
 Camp Currey, Oregon  1865-1866  
 Camp Logan, Oregon (1865-1868) 
 Camp Lyon, Oregon (1865-1869) 
 Camp Polk, Oregon (1865-1866) 
 Camp on Silvies River, Oregon (1864?) 
 Camp Wright, Oregon (1865-1866) 
 Old Camp Warner, Oregon (1866-1867) 
 Camp Warner, Oregon (1867-1874)

See also
Pacific Coast Theater of the American Civil War
Idaho in the American Civil War
Montana in the American Civil War
Washington in the American Civil War

References

Further reading
 Carter, Bryan Anthony. "Frontier Apart: Identity, Loyalty, and the Coming of the Civil War on the Pacific Coast" (PhD. Diss. Oklahoma State University, 2014) online, with detail;ed bibliography
 Edwards, G. Thomas. “Six Oregon Leaders and the Far-Reaching Impact of America’s
Civil War.” Oregon Historical Quarterly 100#1 (Spring 1999): 4-31.
 Etulain, Richard W. Lincoln and Oregon Country Politics in the Civil War Era (2013).
 Smith, Stacey L. "Oregon's Civil War: The Troubled Legacy of Emancipation in the Pacific Northwest." Oregon Historical Quarterly 115.2 (2014): 154-173.

 
Pacific Coast Theater of the American Civil War
American Civil War by state